Gyodong In clan was one of the Korean clans. Their Bon-gwan is in Ganghwa County, Incheon. According to the research in 2015, the number of Gyodong In clan was 20,737 people. Their founder was  who was an Adjunct in Jin dynasty, China. He was dispatched to Silla as an embassy. After that, he was naturalized to Silla.

Clan Residences
The Gyodong In clan is reported to have a couple of villages (집성촌) where the members are made up of mostly people from the Gyodong In clan, these areas include/included:

 Yeomul-ri, Yi-an Myeon, Sangju, Gyeongsangbukdo
 Guhyang-ri, Hamchang-Eup, Sangju, Gyeongsangbukdo
 Daga-dong, Dongnam-Gu, Daejeon
 Songhak-ri, Myeoncheon-Myeon, Dangjin, Chungcheongnamdo
 Samhwa-ri, Seokmun-Myeon, Dangjin, Chungcheongnamdo
 Naksang-ri, Deoksan-Myeon, Yesan, Chungcheongnamdo
 Yongdong-ri, Sapgyo-Eub, Yesan, Chungcheongnamdo
 Jangsan-ri, Munsan-Eup, Paju, Gyeonggido
 Daechon-ri (Formerly Noktan-ri of Sangwol-Myeon), Pyeongsan, North Hwanghae Province
 Nampo-Ri (Formerly and still recorded as Changreung-ri in genealogy books), Nam-Myeon, Kaepoong, Gyeonggido

See also 
 Korean clan names of foreign origin

References

External links 
 

 
Korean clan names of Chinese origin